This list outlines notable historical novels by the current geo-political boundaries of countries for the historical location in which most of the novel takes place. This list includes only the most notable novels within the genre, which have been included in Wikipedia. For a more comprehensive automatically generated list of articles on Wikipedia about historical novels, see :Category:Historical novels. For a comprehensive list by time period on historical fiction in general see list of historical fiction by time period.

Afghanistan
The Afghan Campaign by Steven Pressfield (Alexander the Great's invasion of the Afghan kingdoms in 330 BC)
Flashman by George MacDonald Fraser (1840s, First Anglo-Afghan War)
Caravans by James Michener (post-World War II)

Argentina
On Heroes and Tombs by Ernesto Sabato (19th century, during the Civil War)
Facundo: Civilization and Barbarism by Domingo F. Sarmiento (19th century)
Santa Evita by Tomás Eloy Martínez (20th century, Eva Perón)
El combate perpetuo by Marcos Aguinis (19th century, Admiral William Brown)
La fragata Proserpina by Luis Delgado Bañón (19th century)
El queche Hiena by Luis Delgado Bañón (19th century)

Australia
The Playmaker and Bring Larks and Heroes by Thomas Keneally (18th century colonial Australia)
Morgan's Run by Colleen McCullough (end of the 18th century)
Destiny in Sydney by D. Manning Richards (1787–1902 Scots-Irish, Aboriginal, and Chinese family saga story)
The Lambing Flat by Nerida Newton (mid-19th century Australian gold rushes)
The Secret River by Kate Grenville (19th century colonial Australia)
Jack Maggs by Peter Carey (19th century colonial Australia)
The Thorn Birds by Colleen McCullough (end of the 19th century)
True History of the Kelly Gang by Peter Carey (Kelly Gang, 1878–1880)
An Angel in Australia by Thomas Keneally (World War II)
Oscar and Lucinda by Peter Carey
Jasper Jones by Craig Silvey (1960s Western Australia)
Bila Yarrudhanggalangdhuray by Anita Heiss (19th century indigenous New South Wales)

Austria 
 The Man Without Qualities by Robert Musil (World War I)

Bangladesh
The Black Coat by Neamat Imam (Sheikh Mujibur Rahman's rule in Bangladesh, 1972–75, including famine of 1974)

Belgium
The Legend of Thyl Ulenspiegel and Lamme Goedzak by Charles De Coster (Protestant Reformation in the Netherlands)
The Sorrow of Belgium (Het verdriet van België) by Hugo Claus (WW II and after)

Bosnia and Herzegovina
The Bridge on the Drina by Ivo Andrić (1500s–1900s)

Brazil
Alfarrábios by José de Alencar (Colonial Brazil)
Iracema by José de Alencar (legend from Ceara, 16th century)
The Guarani by José de Alencar (Brazil, 16th century)
Brazil Red by Jean-Christophe Rufin (recounts the unsuccessful attempt by the French to conquer Brazil, 16th century)
As Minas de Prata by José de Alencar (Minas Gerais, 18th century)
O Tempo e o Vento by Érico Veríssimo (from the late 18th century to 1945)
Os Sertões by Euclides da Cunha (Canudos Campaign, 19th century)
La guerra del fin del mundo by Mario Vargas Llosa (Canudos Campaign, 19th century)

Canada
The Orenda by Joseph Boyden (17th-century Quebec)
The Last Crossing by Guy Vanderhaeghe (19th century western Canada)
All That Matters by Wayson Choy (1920s–1940s Vancouver)
Journey by James A. Michener
Alias Grace by Margaret Atwood
Three Day Road by Joseph Boyden
The Colony of Unrequited Dreams by Wayne Johnston
The Book of Negroes by Lawrence Hill
In the Skin of a Lion by Michael Ondaatje
Jalna by Mazo de la Roche
The Jade Peony by Wayson Choy (1930s–1940s Vancouver)

Caribbean (multiple countries)
Unburnable by Marie-Elena John (the African origins of Caribbean culture and the original inhabitants of the Caribbean, the Kalinago (Carib Indians)).
Caribbean by James A. Michener

China
Empress by Shan Sa (Wu Zetian, 1st century)
Chia Black Dragon series by Stephen Marley (2nd century, 7th century)
Romance of the Three Kingdoms by Luo Guanzhong (3rd century)
The Journeyer by Gary Jennings (Kublai Khan, 13th century)
The Deer and the Cauldron by Jin Yong - Early Qing dynasty during the rule of the Kangxi Emperor. (1654–89)
The Story of the Stone by Cao Xueqin (18th century)
Tai-Pan by James Clavell (Hong Kong, 1841)
Peony by Pearl Buck (19th century, Jewish family in China)
Imperial Woman by Pearl Buck (about Empress Dowager Cixi)
Empress Orchid by Anchee Min (about Empress Dowager Cixi)
The Last Empress by Anchee Min (about Empress Dowager Cixi)
Empire of the Sun by J. G. Ballard (World War II)
Dragon Seed by Pearl Buck (Life of Chinese peasant family during Second Sino-Japanese War)
Noble House by James Clavell (Hong Kong, 1963)
La mujer en la muralla by Alberto Laiseca (Qin Shi Huang, 3rd century BC)
An Insular Possession by Timothy Mo (Canton, Macau, and Hong Kong) (1833-1841)

Colombia
The General in his Labyrinth by Gabriel García Márquez

Pre-Columbian civilizations

Aztec Empire
The Fair God; or The Last of the 'Tzins: A Tale of the Conquest of Mexico (1873) by Lew Wallace (16th century)
Aztec by Gary Jennings (before Spanish invasion)
Aztec Autumn by Gary Jennings (one generation after Spanish invasion)
Tlaloc Weeps For Mexico by László Passuth (Hernán Cortés, Conquest of Mexico)	
El Corazón de Piedra Verde (The Green-Stone Heart) by Salvador de Madariaga (encounter between Aztecs and Spanish)

Inca Empire
El inca by Alberto Vázquez-Figueroa

Mayan Empire
Caminarás con el Sol by Alfonso Mateo-Sagasta (Gonzalo Guerrero)
Gonzalo Guerrero by Eugenio Aguirre

Czech Republic
Witiko by Adalbert Stifter (Witiko of Prčice, 12th century Bohemia)

Denmark
Number the Stars by Lois Lowry (20th century)

Dominican Republic
In the Time of the Butterflies by Julia Alvarez (rebellion against Rafael Leónidas Trujillo, mid-20th century)
The Feast of the Goat by Mario Vargas Llosa (Assassination of Trujillo and its aftermath, early 1960s)

Egypt
Cheops by Paul West (26th century BC)
Pharaoh by Bolesław Prus (fall of Egypt's Twentieth Dynasty and New Kingdom)
Hypatia by Charles Kingsley (late Roman Egypt)
The Egyptian by Mika Waltari (reign of Pharaoh Akhenaten)
The Memoirs of Cleopatra by Margaret George (reign of Cleopatra VII)
River God by Wilbur Smith
Leo Africanus by Amin Maalouf (15th and 16th century)
El arpista ciego by Terenci Moix
No digas que fue un sueño by Terenci Moix (reign of Cleopatra VII)	
Child of the Morning  by Pauline Gedge (reign of Hatshepsut)
Scroll of Saqqara  by Pauline Gedge
La boca del Nilo  by León Arsenal
El secreto del Nilo by Antonio Cabanas (Amenhotep III, Akhenaten, Smenkhkare, Tutankhamun, Ay and Horemheb reigns)
La conjura del faraón by Antonio Cabanas	
El Ladrón de Tumbas by Antonio Cabanas	
El Camino de los dioses by Antonio Cabanas

Estonia
Purge by Sofi Oksanen (20th century)

Finland
The Adventurer by Mika Waltari (16th century)

France
The Jester by James Patterson (11th century)
Les Rois maudits series (The Accursed Kings) by Maurice Druon (14th century)
Quentin Durward by Sir Walter Scott (Louis XI – 15th century)
The Hunchback of Notre Dame by Victor Hugo (15th century)
Queen Margot by Alexandre Dumas, père (16th century)
The Angélique series by Anne & Serge Golon (mid-17th century in the reign of Louis XIV)
The d'Artagnan romances (The Three Musketeers, Twenty Years After, and The Vicomte de Bragelonne) by Alexandre Dumas, père (17th century)
A Place of Greater Safety by Hilary Mantel (French Revolution)
A Tale of Two Cities by Charles Dickens (French Revolution)
Scaramouche by Rafael Sabatini (French Revolution)
Ninety-Three by Victor Hugo (1793, French Revolution)
The Rover by Joseph Conrad (Revolutionary and Napoleonic periods)
Les Misérables by Victor Hugo (19th century)
The Count of Monte Cristo by Alexandre Dumas, père (19th century)
Cézanne’s Quarry by Barbara Corrado Pope, (Belle Époque)
The Blood of Lorraine by Barbara Corrado Pope, (Belle Époque)
The Missing Italian Girl by Barbara Corrado Pope, (Belle Époque)
An Officer and a Spy by Robert Harris (the Dreyfus affair)
The Four Horsemen of the Apocalypse by Vicente Blasco Ibáñez (World War I)

Germany
Q (1999) by Luther Blissett (15th-century Europe during the Protestant reformation and German Peasants' War)
Measuring the World by Daniel Kehlmann (19th century)
Night Thoughts of a Classical Physicist by Russell McCormmach (development of physics in the early 20th century)
The Seventh Gate by Richard Zimler (1930s Berlin)
The Book Thief by Markus Zusak (World War II)
Los demonios de Berlín by Ignacio del Valle (Battle of Berlin)

Greece
Hades' Daughter by Sara Douglass (classical antiquity)
Tides of War: A Novel of Alcibiades and the Peloponnesian War by Steven Pressfield
The Palaeologian Dynasty. The Rise and Fall of Byzantium by George Leonardos
Gates of Fire by Steven Pressfield (the Battle of Thermopylae)
Middlesex by Jeffrey Eugenides (World War I and Greco-Turkish War)
The Last of the Wine by Mary Renault (Athens in the time of Socrates)
The Mask of Apollo by Mary Renault (Greek theatre, 4th century BC)
The Athenian Murders (La caverna de las ideas) by Jose Carlos Somoza (classical antiquity)
Lion of Macedon by David Gemmell (Alexander's general Parmenion)
Fire from Heaven and The Persian Boy by Mary Renault (Alexander the Great)
Funeral Games by Mary Renault (the successors of Alexander)
Goat Song by Frank Yerby (Peloponnesian War)
La joven de Esparta by Cristina Rodríguez
The Song Of Troy by Colleen McCullough (the Greek - Trojan war)
Salamina by Javier Negrete, (Second Persian invasion of Greece, Themistocles)
El espartano by Javier Negrete, (Second Persian invasion of Greece)
El agua y la tierra by Julio Murillo
Los milagros del vino by Jesús Sánchez Adalid (Corinth, 1st century AD)
Enemigos de Esparta by Sebastián Roa (Theban hegemony rising)
El ateniense by Pedro Santamaría (Alcibiades)
Némesis by Sebastián Roa (Artemisia I of Caria)

Greenland
The Greenlanders by Jane Smiley

Haiti 
Lydia Bailey by Kenneth Roberts (1800s Haitian Revolution)
Haitian Revolution trilogy by Madison Smartt Bell (Toussaint Louverture and the Haitian Revolution)
The Kingdom of This World by Alejo Carpentier (Haitian Revolution)
Island Beneath the Sea by Isabel Allende (late 18th century)
Babouk by Guy Endore (Haitian Revolution)

Hungary
A fekete város (The Black Town, 1910) by Kálmán Mikszáth (set in the 18th c.)
Sorstalanság (Fatelessness; Fateless (2001) by Imre Kertész (Nobel Prize winner, set in World War II)
Prague (2002) by Arthur Phillips (set in the 1990s)

India

Bengali
Durgeshnôndini, Rajshingho, Anondomôţh by Bankim Chandra Chattopadhyay
Ghôre Baire by Rabindranath Tagore

English
A Spoke in the Wheel by Amita Kanekar (Gautama Buddha/Ashoka)
Chanakya's Chant by Ashwin Sanghi (4th century BC)
Empire of the Moghul series by Alex Rutherford (Moghul Empire, Babur to Aurangzeb)
Guardian of the Dawn by Richard Zimler (17th century Goa)
The Far Pavilions by M. M. Kaye (British India in the 19th century)
The Ibis trilogy by Amitav Ghosh (before and during the First Opium War)
The Siege of Krishnapur by J. G. Farrell (Indian Rebellion of 1857)
Midnight's Children by Salman Rushdie (Partition of India)

Hindi
Volga Se Ganga by Mahapandit Rahul Sankrityayan

Malayalam
Marthandavarma, Dharmaraja, Ramarajabahadur by C V Raman Pillai

Tamil
Parthiban Kanavu and Sivagamiyin Sabadham by Kalki Krishnamurthy (Pallava dynasty)
Ponniyin Selvan by Kalki Krishnamurthy (Chola dynasty)
Vengaiyin Mayinthan by Akilan (Rajendra Chola I, 11th century)

Telugu
Veyipadagalu by Viswanatha Satyanarayana

Urdu
Aag Ka Darya (River of Fire) by Qurratulain Hyder
Aangan (Courtyard)  by Khadija Mastoor
Bano by Razia Butt

Gujarati
Karan Ghelo by Nandshankar Mehta

Indonesia 
Bumi Manusia (This Earth of Mankind), Anak Semua Bangsa (Child of All Nations), Jejak Langkah (Footsteps) and Rumah Kaca (House of Glass) by Pramoedya Ananta Toer (Dutch colonialism, late 19th early 20th century)
Max Havelaar by Multatuli (Dutch colonialism, 19th century)

Iran
Cry of the Peacock by Gina B. Nahai (Jews in Iran, 18th–20th centuries)
Whirlwind by James Clavell (Iranian Revolution, 1979)

Ireland
Trinity and Redemption by Leon Uris
The Princes of Ireland: The Dublin Saga and The Rebels of Ireland: The Dublin Saga by Edward Rutherfurd
Troubles by J. G. Farrell (Irish War of Independence)
A Star Called Henry by Roddy Doyle (Irish Revolution)
Sister Fidelma series by Peter Tremayne (7th century)
Lion of Ireland by Morgan Llywelyn (High King Brian Boru, 10th century)

Israel
The Source by James A. Michener
The King of Flesh and Blood by Moshe Shamir (2nd century BCE)
The Antagonists: A Novel of Masada by Ernest K. Gann (1st century)
The Gospel According to Lazarus by Richard Zimler (1st century)
Holy Warrior by Angus Donald, second novel in the Outlaw Chronicles (12th century)
Jerusalem by Cecelia Holland (12th century)
Exodus by Leon Uris (SS Exodus and the founding of Israel)
The Haj by Leon Uris (1920s–1950s)
The Hope by Herman Wouk (Creation of Israel to the Six-Day War, 1948–1967)
The Glory by Herman Wouk (Six-Day War to Peace with Egypt, 1967–1978)
Inside, Outside by Herman Wouk (Four generations of a Russian Jewish family in the 20th century)
Vengeance by George Jonas (Following Operation Wrath of God - the Israeli hunt for the 1972 Munich Olympics massacre planners).

Italy
Raptor by Gary Jennings (5th–6th centuries)
A Struggle for Rome (Ein Kampf um Rom) by Felix Dahn (Gothic War)
Tiara i korona by Teodor Jeske-Choiński  (Pope Gregory VII and Henry IV, Holy Roman Emperor, 11th century)
Baudolino by Umberto Eco (12th century)
Valperga by Mary Shelley (14th century; Guelphs and Ghibellines)
The Name of the Rose by Umberto Eco (14th century)
La Cruz y el Lirio Dorado by Fernando Fernán-Gómez (Pazzi conspiracy, 15th century)
The Birth of Venus by Sarah Dunant (Florence, Savonarola period)
Prince of Foxes by Samuel Shellabarger (Renaissance)
Romola by George Eliot (Renaissance)
The Family by Mario Puzo (Renaissance)
The Betrothed by Alessandro Manzoni (17th century)
Silk by Alessandro Baricco (1860s)
The Prague Cemetery by Umberto Eco (19th century)
La confesión del embajador by Juan Martín Salamanca (17th century, Spanish ambassador in Duchy of Savoy)

Japan
Musashi by Eiji Yoshikawa (Miyamoto Musashi, 17th century)
Shōgun, Gai-Jin & King Rat by James Clavell
Silence by Shusaku Endo (Jesuit missionary in the 17th century)
The Samurai by Shusaku Endo (The journey of four samurai to Spain in the 17th century)
The Tale of Genji by Murasaki Shikibu, 11th century
The Thousand Autumns of Jacob de Zoet by David Mitchell (Dutch trading concession with Japan in the late 18th century)
Heike Monogatari by Yoshida Kenkō, (Genpei War)
Taiko by Eiji Yoshikawa (Toyotomi Hideyoshi, 16th century)
The Samurai by Shūsaku Endō (Keichō Embassy to Spain, Hasekura Tsunenaga)
Las piedras de Chihaya trilogy by Sergio Vega (Kenmu Restoration)	
El hilo del karma 	
La nube rasgada 	
El Dragón y el Crisantemo	
El guerrero a la sombra del cerezo by David B. Gil (Edo period)		
Ocho millones de dioses by David B. Gil
Forjada en la tormenta by David B. Gil

Korea
A Single Shard by Linda Sue Park

Malta
The Siege of Malta by Walter Scott
Eight Pointed Cross by Marthese Fenech
Falcon's Shadow by Marthese Fenech

Mexico
The Fair God; or The Last of the 'Tzins: A Tale of the Conquest of Mexico (1873) by Lew Wallace (16th century)
Mexico by James A. Michener
Captain from Castile by Samuel Shellabarger (16th century)
Hunger's Brides by Paul Anderson (17th century, Sor Juana)
Caballero by Jovita González and Eve Raleigh (1840s)
Cartucho by Nellie Campobello (Mexican Revolution)
The Power and the Glory by Graham Greene (1930s)
Aztec and Aztec Autumn by Gary Jennings (16th century)
El navío Asia by Luis Delgado Bañón (19th century)

Netherlands
Girl with a Pearl Earring by Tracy Chevalier (Johannes Vermeer, 17th century)
The Black Tulip by Alexandre Dumas, père (17th century)
The Cloister and the Hearth by Charles Reade (15th century)
The Coffee Trader by David Liss (17th century)
The Miniaturist by Jessie Burton (17th century Amsterdam)

New Zealand
The Luminaries by Eleanor Catton (1860s New Zealand gold rush)
Season of the Jew by Maurice Shadbolt (mid-nineteenth century New Zealand)

Norway
Kristin Lavransdatter by Sigrid Undset (14th century)
The Master of Hestviken by Sigrid Undset (14th century)

Pakistan
Khaak aur Khoon by Naseem Hijazi
Shaheen by Naseem Hijazi
Shahab Nama by Qudratullah Shahab

Palestine
The Talisman by Sir Walter Scott (12th century, Third Crusade)
El asombroso viaje de Pomponio Flato by Eduardo Mendoza

Philippines
Noli Me Tángere by José Rizal (early 1880s Philippines, under Spanish colonial rule)
El filibusterismo by José Rizal (set 13 years after the events of Noli Me Tángere)
The Woman Who had Two Navels by Nick Joaquin
Po-on by F. Sionil José (Set in the late 19th century.)

Poland
Poland by James A. Michener (13th century onward)
Krzyzacy (The Teutonic Knights) by Henryk Sienkiewicz (Teutonic Knights, 14th century)
The Trilogy by Henryk Sienkiewicz (17th century, including the Khmelnytsky Uprising and The Deluge)
Thaddeus of Warsaw by Jane Porter (Polish–Lithuanian Commonwealth)
Push Not the River by James Conroyd Martin (1792 Partition of Poland)
The Faithful River (Wierna rzeka) by Stefan Żeromski (January Uprising, 1863–1865)
The Warsaw Anagrams by Richard Zimler (Warsaw Ghetto, 1940–1943)
Kamienie na szaniec (Stones for the Rampart) by Aleksander Kamiński (Polish Scouting or Gray Ranks during World War II)

Portugal
The Last Kabbalist of Lisbon by Richard Zimler (early 16th-century Lisbon, Lisbon Massacre of 1506)
Baltasar and Blimunda by José Saramago (18th-century construction of the Convent of Mafra)
Hunting Midnight by Richard Zimler (19th century Porto)

Ancient Rome

Scipio trilogy by Santiago Posteguillo (the Punic Wars general Publius Cornelius Scipio)
The Masters of Rome series by Colleen McCullough (1st century BC)
The Gods of War (Life of Julius Caesar)
The Ides of March by Thornton Wilder (Last days of Julius Caesar)
La leyenda del falso traidor by Antonio Gómez Rufo (Assassination of Julius Caesar)
El lazo de púrpura by Alejandro Núñez Alonso (Tiberius period)
King Jesus by Robert Graves
Ben-Hur: A Tale of the Christ by Lew Wallace
I Am a Barbarian by Edgar Rice Burroughs (The life of Caligula as seen through the eyes of his slave)
I, Claudius and Claudius, the God by Robert Graves (Roman emperors, 1st century)
Quo Vadis by Henryk Sienkiewicz (Christians under Nero)
The Roman Mysteries, a series of children's books by Caroline Lawrence (late 1st century)
Trajan trilogy by Santiago Posteguillo (Trajan life)	
Memoirs of Hadrian by Marguerite Yourcenar (life and death of Roman Emperor Hadrian)
Julian by Gore Vidal (Julian the Apostate, 4th century)
Eagle in the Snow by Wallace Breem (Magnus Maximus, 4th century)
The Last Romans by Teodor Jeske-Choiński (Theodosius I, 4th century Roman Emperor)
Count Belisarius by Robert Graves (the Byzantine general Belisarius, 6th century)
Pax romana by Yeyo Balbás
Memorias de Escipión Emiliano by José Enrique López Jiménez
Al servicio del imperio by Pedro Santamaría (Cantabri in First Jewish–Roman War)
El saqueo de Roma by Pedro Santamaría (Sack of Rome (410))
El primer senador de Roma: Carthago delenda est by Juan Torres Zalba (Numantine War, Siege of Carthage (Third Punic War))

Russia
War and Peace by Leo Tolstoy (Napoleonic era)
La sombra del águila by Arturo Pérez-Reverte (Napoléon's invasion)
The Life of Klim Samgin by Maxim Gorky (World War I and Russian 1917 Revolution)
Moscow by Andrei Bely (World War I and Russian 1917 Revolution)
Blood Red, Snow White by Marcus Sedgwick (Russian 1917 Revolution)
Doctor Zhivago by Boris Pasternak (Russian 1917 Revolution and Russian Civil War)
And Quiet Flows the Don by Mikhail Sholokhov (Russian 1917 Revolution and Russian Civil War)
The White Guard by Mikhail Bulgakov (Russian Civil War)
Life and Fate by Vasily Grossman (Eastern Front)
The Red Wheel by Aleksandr Solzhenitsyn (World War I and Russian 1917 Revolution)
Russka by Edward Rutherfurd (1800 years of Russian history from pre-Russia to the beginning of the Russian Revolution)
El tiempo de los emperadores extraños by Ignacio del Valle (Blue Division on the Eastern Front)

Sicily
The Lady of the Wheel by Angelo F. Coniglio (19th century foundlings and sulfur mine workers)
The Leopard or Il Gattopardo by Giuseppe Tomasi di Lampedusa (19th century Risorgimento, Giuseppe Garibaldi)
The Sicilian by Mario Puzo (Fictionalized biography of Sicilian popular hero Salvatore Giuliano.)

South Africa
The Covenant by James A. Michener (from prehistory onwards)
King Solomon's Mines by H. Rider Haggard (19th century)

Spain

Multiple time frames
Un soldado español de veinte siglos by José Gómez de Arteche

Early history
Viriato by João Aguiar (1st century BC, Viriathus)	
Rey Lobo by Juan Eslava Galán	
Nublares series by Antonio Pérez Henares (Paleolithic)  	
El Último Soldurio by Javier Lorenzo (1st century BC) 	
Numancia by José Luis Corral (1st century BC, Numantia)  	
El hombre de la plata by León Arsenal (Tartessos)	
Celtiberia series by Ángel L. Gallero (Celtiberians)	
En los reinos de Lug 	
Arde Iberia	
El arévaco

Roman Spain

A Dying Light in Corduba by Lindsey Davis	
Sertorio by João Aguiar (Quintus Sertorius)	
Hay luz en casa de Publio Fama by Juan Miñana		
Los arcos del agua by Montse Barderi	
Interregno by José Vicente Pascual

Visigothic Kingdom
Última Roma by León Arsenal (6th century)  	
Sombras de mariposa by Guillermo Galván (Liuvigild, Visigothic Kingdom)  	 		
Astur by Isabel San Sebastián (8th century Spain)  	
La última visigoda by Isabel San Sebastián (8th century Spain)
El reino imposible by Yeyo Balbás (8th century Spain)
Las cenizas de Hispania series by Ángel José Zoilo Hernández (Suebi, Alans, Vandals and Visigoths in Spain)	
El alano 	
Niebla y acero
El dux del fin del mundo

Medieval
Tales of Count Lucanor by Don Juan Manuel, príncipe de Villena (14th century)
El mercenario de Granada by Juan Eslava Galán	
El Doncel de don Enrique el Doliente by Mariano José de Larra (Enrique III de Castilla)	
Sancho Saldaña o el castellano de Cuellar by José de Espronceda	
Il cavaliere invisibile by Valerio Massimo Manfredi (14th century)
Tales of the Alhambra by Washington Irving (Emirato de Granada)
Los bandos de Castilla by Ramón López Soler (15th century)
Reinos de Sangre by Óscar Eimil (Fernando I)	
Los bandos de Castilla by Ramón López Soler (15th century)	
Los malos años by León Arsenal (14th century, Pedro I de Castilla and Blanca de Borbón)		
1369 by Juan Rey (14th century, Pedro I de Castilla)		
Corazón oscuro by León Arsenal (Battle of Teba, Alfonso XI of Castile, James Douglas death, Robert the Bruce heart in Spain.)	
Tiempo de bastardos by Paula Cifuentes (14th century, Beatriz de Portugal)	
La tierra de Alvar Fañez by Antonio Pérez Henares (11th century, Álvar Fáñez)		
El Rey Pequeño by Antonio Pérez Henares (11th century, Alfonso VIII)
El reino de la espada by Álvaro Moreno Ancillo (13th century)	
El peón del Rey by Pedro Jesús Fernández (Camino de Santiago, Alfonso X court)
Catalina de Lancaster by María Teresa Álvarez (14th century, Catalina de Lancaster)
El camino mozarabe by Jesús Sánchez Adalid (Embassies between Ramiro II of León and Abderramán III after Battle of Simancas)	
Enrique de Castilla by Margarita Torres (13th century, Henry of Castile)	
Doña Blanca de Navarra by Francisco Navarro Villoslada (15th century, Blanca de Navarra) 	
Las Compañías Blancas (Los Malandrines) by Tomás Salvador (14th century, Bertrand du Guesclin)	
Alcazaba by Jesús Sánchez Adalid (Mérida uprising against Abderramán II)	
Esperando al Rey by José María Pérez González (12th century, Alfonso VII of León and Castile and his children Sancho III of Castile and Ferdinand II of León)	
Salvatierra by Miguel Martínez (13th century, Order of Calatrava, Salvatierra Castle)	
El ejército de Dios by Sebastián Roa (Almohad Caliphate in Spain)	
El Reino del norte by Jose Javier Esparza (9th century. Early Reconquista)	
Recuerde el alma dormida by Rafael Álvarez Avello (Jorge Manrique)
María de Molina by Almudena de Arteaga
El olor de las especias by Alfonso Mateo-Sagasta		
Die Rose von Asturien by Iny Lorentz
El Alma de la Ciudad by Jesús Sánchez Adalid
El señor de Bembibre by Enrique Gil y Carrasco (14th century)
La maldición de la reina Leonor by José María Pérez González
La reina sin reino by José María Pérez González
El Reino del norte by Jose Javier Esparza (9th century. Early Reconquista )
Guzmán el Bueno. El señor de la frontera by Juan Luis Pulido Begines (Alonso Pérez de Guzmán)
Tierra vieja by Antonio Pérez Henares
Cova Dónnica by Yeyo Balbás (Don Pelayo)
Las Navas by Juda Barber (Battle of Las Navas de Tolosa)

Spanish Golden Age
El ingenioso hidalgo Don Quijote de la Mancha by Miguel de Cervantes Saavedra (16th century)
The Ferdinand and Isabella Trilogy by Jean Plaidy (15th century)
Adventures of Captain Alatriste series by Arturo Pérez-Reverte
The heretic. A Novel of the Inquisition by Miguel Delibes (16th century in Valladolid)
Martín Ojo de Plata series by Matilde Asensi (17th century)
That Lady by Kate O'Brien (Ana de Mendoza, Princesa of Éboli)
Jeromín by Luis Coloma (life of Juan de Austria)
Capa y espada by Fernando Fernán Gómez (court of Philip IV of Spain, murder of Count of Villamediana)
El comedido hidalgo by Juan Eslava Galán
El prisionero de Argel by Antonio Cavanillas de Blas (life of Miguel de Cervantes Saavedra)
La sombra de otro by Luis García Jambrina (life of Miguel de Cervantes Saavedra)	
Misterioso asesinato en casa de Cervantes by Juan Eslava Galán (Miguel de Cervantes Saavedra in Valladolid, Ezpeleta process)	
By Fire, By Water by Mitchell James Kaplan (15th century)
Sobra un rey by José García Abad (15th century) 
La reina comunera by José García Abad (Juana I de Castilla, Revolt of the Comuneros)  
El castellano de Flandes by Enrique Martínez Ruiz (16th century)  
Hoy no se pondrá el sol by Rafael Rico Cabeza (Spanish Road, Duke of Alba)	
Su peor enemigo by Alfonso Mateo-Sagasta  (Alonso Fernández de Avellaneda)
Isidoro de Montemayor series by Alfonso Mateo-Sagasta (17th century)
 Ladrones de tinta
 El gabinete de las maravillas
 El reino de los hombres sin amor
Rojo amanecer en Lepanto by Luis Zueco (life of Alejandro Farnesio y Habsburgo and Juan de Austria, Battle of Lepanto)
The last crusader by Louis de Wohl (Juan de Austria) 
Leonor de Habsburgo by Yolanda Scheuber (Leonor de Habsburgo)  
Decidnos ¿Quién mató al conde? by Néstor Luján (court of Philip IV of Spain, murder of Count of Villamediana)  
La cruz en la espada by Néstor Luján (court of Philip IV of Spain, last years of Francisco de Quevedo)  
El caballero de Alcántara by Jesús Sánchez Adalid
Y de repente, Teresa by Jesús Sánchez Adalid (Teresa of Ávila)
The Queen's Vow: A Novel Of Isabella Of Castile by C. W. Gortner (Isabel de Castilla)  	
El abogado de Indias by Amós Milton (A lawyer in Sevilla at 16th century)  
El comendador de Alcántara or El gobernador de Indias by José Miguel Carrillo de Albornoz (Nicolás de Ovando)  
Ronin by Francisco Narla (Samurai in Spain, 17th century)
Capitán Alonso Cobos series by Juan Tazón (Espionage in the time of Felipe II)	
 Los caballeros de las sombras
 Sabed que mi nombre se perdió
Crónica del rey pasmado by Gonzalo Torrente Ballester (Court of Felipe IV)
San Quintín. Memorias del maestre de campo de los tercios Julián Romero  by José Javier Esparza (Battle of St. Quentin (1557))
El náufrago de la Gran Armada by Fernando Martínez Laínez (La Grande y Felicísima Armada)
Lope: la furia del Fénix by Blas Malo (Life of Lope de Vega)
Lope de Vega: El desdén y la furia by Blas Malo (Life of Lope de Vega)
El Gran Capitán by José Calvo Poyato (Gonzalo Fernández de Córdoba)
La hora de Quevedo by Baltasar Magro (Francisco de Quevedo)
Juana, la reina traicionada by Álber Vázquez (Juana I de Castilla)
El sueño del gramático by Eva Díaz Pérez (Antonio de Nebrija)

Picaresque novel
Life and facts of Estebanillo González, man of good humour Anonymous (Thirty Years' War)
Lazarillo de Tormes Anonymous 
La Celestina by Fernando de Rojas  
El Buscón by Francisco de Quevedo

Exploration and conquest
The Heart of Jade (El Corazón de piedra verde) by Salvador de Madariaga
The Islands of Unwisdom by Robert Graves (Álvaro de Mendaña)
Captain From Castile by Samuel Shellabarger (Hernán Cortés Conquest of Mexico)
La aventura equinocial de Lope de Aguirre by Ramón José Sender Garcés (16th century, conqueror Lope de Aguirre)
Tlaloc Weeps for Mexico (Esőisten siratja Mexikót) by László Passuth (Hernán Cortés Conquest of Mexico)	
Malinche by Laura Esquivel (La Malinche)	
Centauros by Alberto Vázquez-Figueroa (Alonso de Ojeda)
Cristóbal Colón: Rumbo a Cipango by Edward Rosset
Los navegantes by Edward Rosset (Fernando de Magallanes, Juan Sebastián Elcano, Andrés de Urdaneta, Miguel López de Legazpi)	
La ruta de las tormentas by Paula Cifuentes (Fourth voyage of Christopher Columbus, Ferdinand Columbus)	
Las huellas del conquistador by José Luis Pérez Regueira (Hernando de Soto exploration of North America)
Hombres valientes, dioses crueles by Eugenio Chouciño
Conquistadores de lo imposible by José Ángel Mañas
Poniente by  Alber Vázquez (The first circumnavigation, Fernando de Magallanes, Juan Sebastián Elcano)
Victoria. La odisea de Magallanes y Elcano by Rafael Marín Trechera (The first circumnavigation, Fernando de Magallanes, Juan Sebastián Elcano)
La travesía final by José Calvo Poyato (Juan Sebastián Elcano, Loaísa expedition)
Lágrimas de oro by José Luis Gil Soto (Francisco Pizarro, Spanish conquest of the Inca Empire)
Pizarro y la conquista del Imperio Inca by Álber Vázquez (Francisco Pizarro, Spanish conquest of the Inca Empire)
El rey del Perú by Juan Pedro Cosano (Gonzalo Pizarro)

18th century
Hombres buenos by Arturo Pérez-Reverte
El día que España derrotó a Inglaterra. De cómo Blas de Lezo, tuerto, manco y cojo, venció en Cartagena de Indias a la otra "Armada Invencible" by Pablo Victoria (Blas de Lezo, Battle of Cartagena de Indias)  	
Mediohombre by Alber Vázquez (Blas de Lezo, Battle of Cartagena de Indias)	
El héroe del Caribe: La última batalla de Blas de Lezo by J. Pérez-Foncea (Blas de Lezo) 	
El paisano de Jamaica by Francisco Javier Romero Valentín (Blas de Lezo, Battle of Cartagena de Indias) 		
Das Ohr das Kapitäns by Gisbert Haefs (Battle of Cartagena de Indias) 	
Beltrán Ochoa, capitán de Dragones series by Octavio Sánchez-Machuca (Carlos III reign)		
El asedio del Diablo 		
El alma en la batalla 		
Emboscada en Nápoles 	
La traición del rey by José Luis Gil Soto (Manuel de Godoy)  
Conjura en Madrid by José Calvo Poyato (War of the Spanish Succession, Conspiration against Philip V)

19th century
National Episodes by Benito Pérez Galdós (19th century)
La regenta by Leopoldo Alas "Clarín" (19th century)
Fortunata y Jacinta by Benito Pérez Galdós (19th century)
Un día de cólera by Arturo Pérez-Reverte (Dos de Mayo Uprising)	
El húsar by Arturo Pérez-Reverte (Napoleonic age)	
The siege (El asedio) by Arturo Pérez-Reverte (1811, Siege of Cádiz)
The Fencing Master by Arturo Pérez-Reverte (Isabella II age)
El secreto del rey cautivo by Antonio Gómez Rufo (Peninsular War)
Vientos de intriga by José Calvo Poyato (Mutiny of Aranjuez, Dos de Mayo Uprising)	
Sangre en la calle del Turco by José Calvo Poyato (Prim murder)
El navío Príncipe de Asturias, Trafalgar by Luis Delgado Bañon (19th century) is the 9th book of Una saga marinera española  	
La artillera by Ángeles de Irisarri (Siege of Saragossa)	
El león de ojos árabes by Antonio Cavanillas de Blas (Isabella II age)
Bandera negra by León Arsenal (Carlist Wars)

20th century
Iberia by James A Michener (20th century)
Winter in Madrid by C. J. Sansom
Episodios nacionales contemporáneos series by Ricardo Fernández de la Reguera and Susana March	
And in the distance a light...? also published as Beasts and Martyrs of Spain (A sangre y fuego. Héroes, bestias y mártires de España) by Manuel Chaves Nogales	
Riña de gatos. Madrid 1936 by Eduardo Mendoza	
El valle de las sombras by Jerónimo Tristante (Construction of the Valle de los Caídos)	
The Communist's Daughter by Dennis Bock	
The Forging of a Rebel trilogy by Arturo Barea
Línea de fuego by Arturo Pérez-Reverte
La sonata del silencio by Paloma Sánchez-Garnica
El arte de matar dragones by Ignacio del Valle

Sweden
The Long Ships by Frans G. Bengtsson (Vikings, 10th century)
The Emigrants tetralogy by Vilhelm Moberg (middle of the 19th century)

Switzerland
Anne of Geierstein by Sir Walter Scott (15th century)

Syria
The End of a Brave Man by Hanna Mina (20th century)

Turkey
The Prince of India; or, Why Constantinople Fell (1893) by Lew Wallace (15th century, Fall of Constantinople)

United Kingdom

Earliest history
Stonehenge: A Novel of 2000 BC by Bernard Cornwell (Stonehenge)
Pillar of the Sky by Cecelia Holland (Stonehenge)
The Stronghold by Mollie Hunter (Orkney in the 1st century BC)

Roman Britain
Under the Eagle and others in the Cato series by Simon Scarrow (Roman invasion, AD 42)
The Silver Pigs, A Body in the Bath House and The Jupiter Myth by Lindsey Davis (crime in the reign of Vespasian, 1st century AD)
The Eagle of the Ninth by Rosemary Sutcliff (2nd century AD)
The Silver Branch by Rosemary Sutcliff (3rd century AD)
The Forest House, and others in the series by Marion Zimmer Bradley
The Eagle and the Raven, by Pauline Gedge (Caradoc, 1st century AD)

Medieval
Porius by John Cowper Powys (Arthurian, 5th century)
Sword at Sunset by Rosemary Sutcliff (Arthurian)
The Saxon Shore by Jack Whyte (Arthurian)
Grail Prince by Nancy McKenzie (Galahad)
Hild by Nicola Griffith (7th century)
The Saxon Stories by Bernard Cornwell (Alfred the Great, (9th century)
Avalon by Anya Seton (10th century)
The Conqueror by Georgette Heyer (William the Conqueror, 11th century)
Hereward the Wake by Charles Kingsley (Norman Conquest)
The Wake by Paul Kingsnorth (11th century)
Outlaw by Angus Donald, the first novel in the Outlaw Chronicles (12th century)
King's Man by Angus Donald, the third in the above series (12th century)
The Pillars of the Earth by Ken Follett (12th-century)
Ivanhoe by Sir Walter Scott (12th century)
Kay the Left-Handed by Leslie Barringer (12th century)
The Pillars of the Earth by Ken Follett (12th century)
Lady of the Forest by Jennifer Roberson (12th century)
Time and Chance by Sharon Kay Penman (12th century)
The Devil's Brood by Sharon Kay Penman (12th century)
Here Be Dragons by Sharon Kay Penman (Wales, 13th century)
The Reckoning by Sharon Kay Penman (13th century Wales)
The Heaven Tree Trilogy by Edith Pargeter (13th century Wales)
The Brothers of Gwynedd Quartet by Edith Pargeter (13th century Wales)
The Scottish Chiefs by Jane Porter (13th century Scotland, William Wallace)
The Fair Maid of Perth by Sir Walter Scott (14th-century Scotland)
The Grail Quest by Bernard Cornwell (14th century)
Katherine by Anya Seton (14th century)
Company of Liars by Karen Maitland (14th century)
World Without End by Ken Follett (14th century)
Owen Glendower by John Cowper Powys (15th century Wales)
Know Ye Not Agincourt? by Leslie Barringer (15th century)
The Sunne in Splendour by Sharon Kay Penman (15th century)
The Load of Unicorn by Cynthia Harnett (Caxton, 15th century London)

Tudor and Stuart
The House of Niccolò and Lymond Chronicles by Dorothy Dunnett (Scotland and beyond, 15th and 16th centuries)
The Fortunes of Perkin Warbeck by Mary Shelley (Henry VII and Perkin Warbeck)
Wolf Hall by Hilary Mantel (Thomas Cromwell's rise to power)
Bring up the Bodies by Hilary Mantel (Thomas Cromwell and Anne Boleyn)
The Other Boleyn Girl by Philippa Gregory (Mary Boleyn)
Amenable Women by Mavis Cheek (Anne of Cleves)
The Fifth Queen by Ford Madox Ford (Katharine Howard)
Young Bess, Elizabeth, Captive Princess and Elizabeth and the Prince of Spain by Margaret Irwin
Kenilworth by Sir Walter Scott (Elizabeth I and Amy Robsart)
Cue for Treason by Geoffrey Trease (English Renaissance theatre/Elizabethan Cumberland and London)
Come Rack! Come Rope! by Robert Hugh Benson (Elizabethan persecution of Catholics)
Woodstock by Sir Walter Scott (English Civil War)
Peveril of the Peak by Sir Walter Scott (English Civil War)
John Inglesant by Joseph Henry Shorthouse (Charles I, English Civil War, Catholic proselytism)
Lady of the Glen by Jennifer Roberson (Massacre of Glencoe)
A Tale of Old Mortality by Sir Walter Scott (17th-century Scottish rebellion)
A Journal of the Plague Year by Daniel Defoe (account of Great Plague of London, 1666)
Year of Wonders by Geraldine Brooks (Great Plague, 1666)
Forever Amber by Kathleen Winsor (17th century, Restoration period)
Royal Escape by Georgette Heyer (Cromwell and Charles II)
Micah Clarke by Sir Arthur Conan Doyle (17th century, Monmouth Rebellion)
Captain Blood by Rafael Sabatini (17th century, Monmouth Rebellion and aftermath)
The Baroque Cycle by Neal Stephenson (English Civil War, rule of Charles II, Glorious Revolution, early 18th century)
Hawksmoor by Peter Akroyd (Christopher Wren, Nicholas Hawksmoor and parallel modern story)
The History of Henry Esmond by William Makepeace Thackeray (reign of Queen Anne)
An Instance of the Fingerpost by Iain Pears (Restoration period)

Hanoverian
Rob Roy by Sir Walter Scott (1715 Jacobite rising)
The Heart of Mid-Lothian by Sir Walter Scott (1730s Scotland and England)
Waverley by Sir Walter Scott (1745 Jacobite rising)
The Luck of Barry Lyndon by William Makepeace Thackeray (18th-century England, Seven Years' War)
Redgauntlet by Sir Walter Scott (Jacobites in Dumfries, 1760s)
Barnaby Rudge: A Tale of the Riots of 'Eighty by Charles Dickens (Gordon riots, 1780)
A Tale of Two Cities by Charles Dickens (London and Paris during the French Revolution)
Richard Sharpe series by Bernard Cornwell (British Army in the Napoleonic Wars)
Horatio Hornblower series by C. S. Forester (British navy in the Napoleonic Wars)
Aubrey–Maturin series by Patrick O'Brian (British Navy in the Napoleonic Wars)
Ramage series by Dudley Pope (British Navy in the Napoleonic Wars)
Bolitho Novels by Alexander Kent (British Navy in the Napoleonic Wars)
Revolution series by Simon Scarrow (Wellington and Napoleon)
Judith by Brian Cleeve (Set around the start of the 19th century)
Thomas Kydd Series by Julian Stockwin, set during the French and Napoleonic Wars
Sacred Hunger by Barry Unsworth (18th century transatlantic slave trade)

Victorian
Fingersmith by Sarah Waters (1860s London and elsewhere)
The Flashman Papers by George MacDonald Fraser (Victorian era)
Laura Blundy by Julie Myerson (Victorian London)
Jamrach's Menagerie by Carol Birch (Victorian London and seafaring)
Lady's Maid by Margaret Forster (concerns Elizabeth Barrett Browning)

20th century
The Wishing Game by Patrick Redmond (life in a strict and uncanny boarding school in rural Norfolk in the 1950s)
The Rotters' Club by Jonathan Coe (1970s)
Diary of an Ordinary Woman by Margaret Forster (a fictional diary of the period)

Multiple time frames
Sarum by Edward Rutherfurd – Tells the story of England through the eyes of six families in the Salisbury area, stretching from Prehistoric Britain through the 1980s
The Outlander series by Diana Gabaldon

United States (including areas that become part of the US)

Colonial
Rachel Dyer: a North American Story by John Neal (Salem witch trials)
Logan, a Family History by John Neal (Aftermath of Lord Dunmore's War)
Seventy-Six by John Neal (American Revolution)
Sergeant Lamb of the Ninth and Proceed, Sergeant Lamb by Robert Graves (American Revolution)
The Fort by Bernard Cornwell (the Penobscot Expedition of the American Revolution)
The Last of the Mohicans by James Fenimore Cooper (French and Indian War)
Richard Carvel by Winston Churchill (Maryland and the American Revolution)
Shadow Patriots, a Novel of the Revolution by Lucia St. Clair Robson (George Washington's Culper Spy Ring)
Johnny Tremain by Esther Forbes (Boston in the 1770s)
Mason & Dixon by Thomas Pynchon (18th century/American Revolution)
War Comes to Willy Freeman by James Lincoln Collier (American Revolution)
 Las huellas del conquistador by José Luis Pérez Regueira (Hernando de Soto exploration of North America) 	
 La fragata Princesa by Luis Delgado Bañón (Alta California, Discovering of Nootka Island)	
 Las batallas hispano-apaches en el salvaje norte de América series by Alber Vázquez (Spanish wars against Apaches)
 Resiste Tucson    
 Largo camino hacia Zuni Pueblo   
 Guerras mescalero en Río Grande 
 Los acasos by Javier Pascual (Spanish wars against Apaches)
 España contraataca: Relato sobre la derrota del imperio inglés en Norteamérica by Pablo Victoria (Bernardo de Gálvez)
 Comanche by Jesús Maeso de la Torre
 La rosa de California by Jesús Maeso de la Torre

19th century
Burr by Gore Vidal (Aaron Burr)
My Theodosia by Anya Seton (The life of Theodosia Burr Alston, her father Aaron Burr's Vice Presidency and subsequent years)
The Confessions of Nat Turner by William Styron (1831 slave revolt)
Roots: The Saga of an American Family by Alex Haley (18th–19th century slavery)
Death Comes for the Archbishop by Willa Cather (mid-19th century New Mexico Territory
Cloudsplitter by Russell Banks (abolitionist John Brown, pre-Civil War)
The Emigrants series by Vilhelm Moberg (Swedish emigrants in Minnesota, 1850s)
The Known World by Edward P. Jones (antebellum Virginia)
The Travels of Jaimie McPheeters by Robert Lewis Taylor (mid-19th century Western wagon train)
Lincoln by Gore Vidal
Across Five Aprils by Irene Hunt (American Civil War)
Andersonville by MacKinlay Kantor (American Civil War)
Cold Mountain by Charles Frazier (American Civil War)
Gone with the Wind by Margaret Mitchell (American Civil War)
The Killer Angels by Michael Shaara (American Civil War)
The Red Badge of Courage by Stephen Crane (American Civil War)
Traveller by Richard Adams (American Civil War, told by Robert E. Lee's horse)
Andersonville by MacKinlay Kantor (Andersonville prison camp)
Shiloh by Shelby Foote
The March by E. L. Doctorow (Sherman's March to the Sea)
True Women by Janice Woods Windle (Texas Revolution, American Civil War, early 20th Century)
Lee and Grant at Appomattox by MacKinlay Kantor (American Civil War)
Oldest Living Confederate Widow Tells All by Allan Gurganus (American Civil War and late 19th century)
Beloved by Toni Morrison (post-Civil War)
Ride the Wind by Lucia St. Clair Robson (Cynthia Ann Parker's life with the Comanches)
The Turquoise by Anya Seton (The Santa Fe Trail and New York society)
Out of This Furnace by Thomas Bell (Immigrants and the steel mills of Pittsburgh, from 1880)
Martin Dressler: The Tale of an American Dreamer by Steven Millhauser (late 19th century New York City)
Shadow Country by Peter Matthiessen (Edgar "Bloody" Watson, late 19th century Florida)
The English Wife by Lauren Willig (New York Gilded Age)
The City Beautiful by Aden Polydoros (Chicago 1893, World's Columbian Exposition)

20th century
Ragtime by E. L. Doctorow (beginning of the 20th century)
The Road to Wellville by T. C. Boyle (the story of Dr. John Harvey Kellogg in 1907)
Lanny Budd series by Upton Sinclair (1913–1949)
Cryptonomicon by Neal Stephenson (American soldiers in World War II)
Two Trains Running by Andrew Vachss (1960 presidential election)

Multiple time frames

Novels by James A. Michener
Alaska (Alaska)
Centennial (Colorado)
Chesapeake (Chesapeake Bay/Delmarva Peninsula)
Hawaii (Hawaii)
Texas (Texas)

Novels by other authors
New York by Edward Rutherfurd (New York City)

Vietnam
The Sorrow of War by Bao Ninh (Vietnam War)
The Lotus Eaters by Tatjana Soli (Vietnam War)

See also
Historical fiction
Historical novel
Novel
Fiction set in ancient Rome
Fiction set in ancient Greece

External links 
Database of German historical novels
Historical Fiction database, divided by time period.
A Guide to the Best Historical Novels and Tales by Jonathan Nield (1902). Project Gutenberg etext (accessed 05-2014)
A selection of historical novels set by epoch and author. (accessed 08-2010)
Annotated list of historical novels for children and teens Anchorage Public Library
History networking Authors, Publishers, Editors, Researchers. Suggest tools and sources, help with reading list, discussions challenges. Network, promote books or find work.

 
Historical